The International Film Music Critics Association Award for Film Score of the Year is an annual award given by the International Film Music Critics Association, or the IFMCA. The award is given to the composer of a single film composition track deemed to be the best in a given year. It has been awards every year since 2006.

Winners and nominations

2000s
Best Single Cue

Film Music Composition of the Year

2010s

2020s

References

International Film Music Critics Association Awards